Jere Uronen (born 13 July 1994) is a Finnish professional footballer who plays as a full-back for Bundesliga club Schalke 04, on loan from Brest, and the Finland national team. He began his senior club career playing for TPS, before signing with Helsingborgs IF at age 17 in 2012.

Uronen made his international debut for Finland in May 2012, at the age of 17 and has since had over 40 caps, including appearing in 2014 and 2018 FIFA World Cup qualifications. He was a regular member of the national team in UEFA Euro 2020 qualification matches and helped Finland secure its first ever place in European Football Championship tournament´s group stage.

Club career

TPS
Born in Turku, Finland, Uronen was raised in TPS's youth ranks. He made his first team debut on 12 June 2011, at the age of 16, in a match against FC Haka. On 31 July, he scored his first goal for TPS, in an eventual 4–2 home defeat against FC Honka. He made in total of 18 appearances – one goal – during his debut season.

Helsingborg
In the early days of 2012 it was announced that Uronen had signed a contract with Helsingborg, in the Allsvenskan. He played his first game for Helsingborg in a friendly match against Dinamo Zagreb on 1 February, playing the full 90 minutes.

He made his league debut on 2 April, coming on as a substitute, in a 1–0 away defeat against Norrköping.

Genk
In January 2016, Uronen signed a contract with Belgian club Genk. He made his Belgian First Division A debut on 13 March 2016 in a match against Oostende.

Brest
On 20 July 2021, it was announced that Uronen would join Ligue 1 club Brest. He made his debut on 7 August 2021 playing full 90 minutes in a match against Olympique Lyon.

Schalke 04 
On 7 January 2023, Uronen joined German side Schalke 04 on a loan until the end of the season, with an option to make the deal permanent. In the process, he became the second Finnish player in the history of the club, after Teemu Pukki.

International career

Finland youth teams
Uronen was chosen to represent Finland U21 in a qualifying match against Slovenia on 8 August 2011, only at the age of 17.

Finland first team
On 26 May 2012, Uronen made his debut for the Finland senior national team, playing full minutes in a 3−2 victory over Turkey and so he became the third youngest player in the history of the national team. Uronen made his FIFA World Cup qualification match debut on 12 October 2012 when Mixu Paatelainen chose him to the starting eleven for a match against Georgia. He made his first international goal in a friendly match against Belarus on Tampere Stadium on 9 June 2018.

Uronen was called up for the UEFA Euro 2020 pre-tournament friendly match against Sweden on 29 May 2021. Uronen played in all three international games at the UEFA Euro 2020 tournament. Finland was placed 3rd in Group B following a 2-0 defeat to Belgium on 21 June 2021. They were subsequently knocked out of the tournament.

Career statistics

Club

International

Scores and results list Finland's goal tally first, score column indicates score after each Uronen goal.

Honours
Helsingborgs IF
Svenska Supercupen: 2012

Genk
Belgian First Division A: 2018–19
Belgian Cup: 2020–21
Belgian Super Cup: 2019

Individual
 Veikkausliiga September All Star Team: 2011

References
 Profile at fc.tps.fi 
 Profile at veikkausliiga.com 
 Veikkausliiga Hall of Fame

External links

 Stade Brestois official profile 
 Jere Uronen  – SPL competition record
 
 
 
 
 

1994 births
Living people
Footballers from Turku
Association football fullbacks
Finnish footballers
Finland international footballers
Finland under-21 international footballers
Finland youth international footballers
Turun Palloseura footballers
Åbo IFK players
Helsingborgs IF players
K.R.C. Genk players
Stade Brestois 29 players
FC Schalke 04 players
Veikkausliiga players
Kakkonen players
Allsvenskan players
Belgian Pro League players
Ligue 1 players
Bundesliga players
UEFA Euro 2020 players
Finnish expatriate footballers
Finnish expatriate sportspeople in Sweden
Expatriate footballers in Sweden
Finnish expatriate sportspeople in Belgium
Expatriate footballers in Belgium
Expatriate footballers in France